Máel Muire Ó Connaig, Bishop of Kilmacduagh, died 1224.

Máel Muire Ó Connaig may have been the first of a number of a number of members of the same family who occupied the see. Énri Ó Connmhaigh (fl. 1405) and Seaán Ó Connmhaigh (1441–78) may bear later forms of a surname that is now rendered as Conway.

Bishop Ó Connaig predecessor, Ua Cellaig, died sometime in 1215 but it is not known when he himself was appointed or consecrated. He died in 1224.

References
 http://www.ucc.ie/celt/published/T100005C/
 http://www.irishtimes.com/ancestor/surname/index.cfm?fuseaction=Go.&UserID=
 The Surnames of Ireland, Edward MacLysaght, 1978.

People from County Galway
Medieval Gaels from Ireland
13th-century Roman Catholic bishops in Ireland
1224 deaths
Year of birth unknown